None But the Lonely Heart is an album by the pianist Chris Anderson and the bassist Charlie Haden. It was recorded in 1997 and released on the Naim label.

Reception
The AllMusic review by Joel Roberts stated: "Chris Anderson is one of the unsung heroes of modern jazz piano. A revered figure among musicians, largely for his role as mentor to a young Herbie Hancock, Anderson has long been hindered by illness from aggressively pursuing his rightful place in the jazz limelight... One hopes that this outstanding, quietly brilliant duo effort with bass master Haden helps earn him some richly deserved acclaim".

Track listing
 "The Night We Called It a Day" (Tom Adair, Matt Dennis) - 13:19 
 "I Hear a Rhapsody" (George Fragos, Jack Baker, Bard, Dick Gasparre) - 7:04 
 "Alone Together" (Howard Dietz, Arthur Schwartz) - 6:52 
 "Nobody's Heart" (Lorenz Hart, Richard Rodgers) - 10:33 
 "Body and Soul" (Edward Heyman, Robert Sour, Frank Eyton, Johnny Green) - 6:24 
 "The Things We Did Last Summer" (Sammy Cahn, Jule Styne) - 5:26 
 "It Never Entered My Mind" (Lorenz Hart, Richard Rodgers) - 9:04 
 "CC Blues" (Chris Anderson, Charlie Haden) - 5:25 
 "Good Morning Heartache" (Irene Higginbotham, Ervin Drake, Dan Fisher) - 8:30 
Recorded at the CAMI Hall in New York on July 5–7, 1997

Personnel
Chris Anderson — piano
Charlie Haden — bass

References 

Naim Records albums
Charlie Haden albums
Chris Anderson (pianist) albums
1997 albums